Etoy is a European digital art group formed in 1994. It has won several international awards including the Prix Ars Electronica in 1996. Their main slogan is: "leaving reality behind."

Etoy has routinely experimented with the boundaries of art, such as selling shares of "stock" in the etoy.corporation, a registered company in Switzerland and travelling the world as well as living in "etoy.tanks" (cargo containers).

History
The group first used the name "etoy" in 1994, for performances at raves and techno music events. The group's members, based in various European countries, were referred to as "agents".

In 2007, German and Swiss director Andrea Reiter realised a documentary (produced by Hugofilm) about etoy's "Mission Eternity" project, a "digital cult of the dead".

As of 2015, a history overview on the group's website describes it as entering "hibernation mode" in 2013.

Toywar

The toywar was a legal battle around 1999/2000 between the Internet toy retailer eToys.com and etoy about the domain name etoy.com. Fearing brand dilution and customer confusion about the similar domain names, eToys sued etoy for trademark infringement, and asked etoy to remove graphic images and profane language from their website that were bringing customer complaints. The artists refused to comply, and eToys eventually obtained a preliminary injunction against etoy which shut down their website. etoy fought back with a coordinated public relations campaign and Internet-based denial of service attacks on eToys.com. After several weeks eToys dropped the lawsuit and the etoy website returned to operation.

etoy activists have called it "the most expensive performance in art history". The story is one of the subjects of the documentary film, info wars.

An email campaign was led by Internet activists including etoy agents developing the toywar website.

A book about the story of the etoy corporation, Leaving reality behind, by Regula Bochsler and Adam Wishart was released in 2002.

References

External links
 website etoy.CORPORATION
the digital hijack
the digital flapjack - a parody of digital hijack created at the 1996 Prix Ars Electronica by SITO
New York Times - EToys Lawsuit Is No Fun for Artist Group
New York Times - ISP Blocked After eToys Protest
New York Times - Etoys Offers to Drop Suit Against Artists Group
New York Times - eToys Drops Lawsuit Against Artist Group
Pam Dixon archive - Cyber artists' toy war is not child's play

European artist groups and collectives
Advocacy groups
Culture jamming